Perakine reductase is an enzyme with systematic name raucaffrinoline:NADP+ oxidoreductase. This enzyme catalyses the following chemical reaction

 raucaffrinoline + NADP+  perakine + NADPH + H+

The biosynthesis of raucaffrinoline from perakine is a side route of the ajmaline biosynthesis pathway.

References

External links 
 

EC 1.1.1